Chris Beattie (born 26 August 1975 in Ipswich, Queensland) is an Australian former professional rugby league footballer who last played for Lézignan Sangliers in the Elite One Championship rugby league competition in France.

Playing career
Beattie made his debut in the National Rugby League in 2000, playing for the Cronulla-Sutherland Sharks, as a 24-year-old.

A regular in the Sharks side, Beattie went on to represent Queensland in the State of Origin, playing two games in 2001 and one in 2002.

Beattie was signed by the Perpignan-based Catalans Dragons in their inaugural Super League season in 2006, after five seasons with the Sharks. 
 
He signed a one-year deal with the Sydney City Roosters for 2007, and in 2008 he joined the Lézignan Sangliers, a French rugby league club.

References

1975 births
Living people
Australian rugby league players
Catalans Dragons players
Cronulla-Sutherland Sharks players
Lézignan Sangliers players
Queensland Rugby League State of Origin players
Rugby league props
Rugby league players from Ipswich, Queensland
Sydney Roosters players